The Italian Federation of Printing and Paper Workers (FILPC) was a trade union representing workers in the printing and papermaking industries in Italy.

The union was founded in 1946 as an affiliate of the Italian General Confederation of Labour, bringing together workers who had previously been represented by various craft unions.  By 1980, the union had 79,430 members.

In 1981, the union merged with the Italian Federation of Entertainment Workers, to form the Italian Federation of Information and Entertainment Workers.

General Secretaries
1946: Giovanni Valdarchi
1967: Giorgio Pavanetto
1970: Giorgio Colzi

References

Printing trade unions
Trade unions established in 1946
Trade unions disestablished in 1981
Trade unions in Italy